The Incarnate Word Cardinals men's basketball statistical leaders are individual statistical leaders of the Incarnate Word Cardinals men's basketball program in various categories, including points, rebounds, assists, steals, and blocks. Within those areas, the lists identify single-game, single-season, and career leaders. The Cardinals represent the University of the Incarnate Word (UIW) in the NCAA Division I Southland Conference.

Incarnate Word began competing in intercollegiate basketball in 1980, and did not start play in Division I until the 2013–14 season, having previously been in Division II. While the NCAA has recorded individual points and rebounds in all three of its current divisions throughout the history of UIW men's basketball, it did not record assists in D-II until the 1988–89 season, and blocks and steals until the 1992–93 season. Nonetheless, the UIW record books include players in these statistics before these seasons. These lists are updated through the end of the 2020–21 season.

Scoring

Rebounds

Assists

Steals

Blocks

References

Lists of college basketball statistical leaders by team
Statistical